Finland competed at the 2014 Winter Olympics in Sochi, Russia from 7 to 23 February 2014. The Finnish team consisted of 103 competitors who participated in alpine skiing, biathlon, cross-country skiing, freestyle skiing, ice hockey, ski jumping, snowboarding, and speed skating.

Medalists

Preparations by the Finnish Olympic Committee

Financial coaching support
The Finnish Olympic Committee launched its Sochi 2014 coaching program in June 2010, distributing financial support in winter sports to member federations and top level athletes directly.

x including ski maintenance, which contributes to biathlon and Nordic combined as well

Ban on rainbow nails 

In August 2013, Helsingin Sanomat quoted the President of the Board of the Finnish Olympic Committee Risto Nieminen, that it is forbidding its athletes the rainbow-patterned fingernails in the upcoming games, ruling it political abuse of the Olympic Charter. The issue was raised after high-jumper Emma Green Tregaro displayed her rainbow nails and the Finnish Minister of Culture and Sport Paavo Arhinmäki waved the rainbow flag in the Moscow 2013 World Championships in Athletics in support of LGBT rights in Russia. Arhinmäki responded, that the Olympic movement should defend, not limit, the freedom of speech, and the Minister for European Affairs and Foreign Trade of Finland Alexander Stubb commented that the issue is about human rights, not politics, both bringing up the 1968 Olympics Black Power salute as one of the finest moments in Olympic history. The Committee followed up, that they were simply quoting the Charter, which bans political abuse, and themselves couldn't allow or disallow the nails.

Athlete prize bonuses 

The Finnish Olympic Committee offers prize bonuses for medalists: €30,000 for gold, €15,000 for silver and €10,000 for bronze, where in team events the price has to be divided between athletes, with a cap of €60,000 per athlete. The exception is for an ice hockey medal where the bonus is €60,000 for gold, €40,000 for silver and €30,000 for bronze.

Budget 

The cost of the games for the Finnish Olympic Committee is 1.2 million euros. About half of it, food and accommodation expenses, will be subsidised by the International Olympic Committee.

Finnish Olympic team 

The Finnish Olympic team in Sochi consists of 226 people, of which 16 are the team's general leadership, 103 athletes, and 107 other staff members, such as coaches, masseurs, physiotherapists and physicians.

Athlete selection method 

Athletes to the Olympic team are picked by the Elite Sports Unit of the Finnish Olympic Committee based on presentations by the national sports federations. The Unit is led by Mika Kojonkoski. It revised the selection from earlier games by creating a continuous method, where athletes are added as they display to fulfill requirements. The athletes are required to

based on their results in the current and previous season. The Committee considered the bar raised from the preceding games.

Schedule for selection publication:
 30 October 2013: first 10 athletes nominated in alpine skiing, biathlon, freestyle skiing, snowboarding and speed skating
 16 December 2013: 14 athletes nominated in cross-country skiing, Nordic combined, ski jumping and snowboarding
 18 December 2013: women's ice hockey team of 21 players nominated
 7 January 2014: men's ice hockey team of 25 players nominated
 13 January 2014: 8 athletes nominated in cross-country skiing and ski jumping
 21 January 2014: 22 athletes nominated in biathlon, freestyle skiing, snowboarding, ski jumping and Nordic combined
 27 January 2014: final 7 athletes nominated in alpine skiing, freestyle skiing, snowboarding and speed skating

Appearance records 

For Janne Ahonen and Teemu Selänne, 2014 will be their sixth Olympic games, tying them for the most Olympic appearances for Finns with Marja-Liisa Kirvesniemi, Harri Kirvesniemi and Raimo Helminen. Selänne will be alongside Helminen the only ice hockey player with six appearances, Selänne already being the all-time Olympic point-leader.

Sports without participation by Finland 
Finland will not compete in bobsleigh, curling, figure skating, luge, short track speed skating and skeleton.
For figure skating Finland has the 2nd stand-by entry for ladies' singles, 4th for ice dancing and 7th for men's singles. The entries may not be transferred after 27 January 2014. Finland failed to qualify the curling team at the Olympic qualification event.

Medal count predictions and expectations 

The Finnish Olympic Committee set no official medal target.

An article published by International Associations of Sports Economists / North American Association of Sports Economists in 2011, using such parameters as population, political regime, snow coverage and winter sports facilities, predicted Finland to win 5 medals.

In a poll ordered by MTV3, a majority from a sample of 1,700 Finns in December 2013 expected Finland to win 2–4 medals, having best chances in snowboarding.

Infostrada Sports predicts that Finland will win one gold and five bronzes, broken down:
 in cross-country skiing: gold in women's team sprint and bronze in women's 4 × 5 kilometre relay
 in biathlon: bronze for Kaisa Mäkäräinen in women's pursuit and sprint
 in ice hockey: bronze in men's and women's tournament

Associated Press projected Finland to win two silvers and three bronzes, broken down:
 in biathlon: silver for Kaisa Mäkäräinen in women's pursuit and mass start
 in cross-country skiing: bronze in women's team sprint and 4 × 5 kilometre relay
 in ice hockey: bronze in women's tournament

Ilta-Sanomat expected certain Finnish medals as a top two finish in women's team sprint, a silver in women's 4 × 5 kilometre relay, a medal in women's ice hockey and possibly multiple medals for Kaisa Mäkäräinen.

PricewaterhouseCoopers, using regression analysis with such variables as gross domestic product and climate to estimate medal shares, predicted Finland to win 6 medals.

Alpine skiing 

Finland has qualified a total quota of four athletes by the International Ski Federation (FIS), based on qualification points awarded in races within the FIS Calendar during the period of July 2012–19 January 2014. National quotas per each Olympic event were allocated according to points awarded in these competitions. Andreas Romar was initially selected to the Finnish Olympic team, but declared absent on January 10, 2014, following his heel fracture.

Biathlon 

Finland has qualified a total quota of four athletes by the International Biathlon Union (IBU), based on Nation Cup points won in 2012 and 2013 Biathlon World Championships during the qualification period of 16 November 2012 – 19 January 2014. There were no event-specific requirements.

Cross-country skiing 

Finland has awarded a total quota of seventeen athletes by International Ski Federation (FIS), based on qualification points awarded in races within the FIS Calendar during the period of July 2012–19 January 2014. National quotas per each Olympic event were allocated according to points awarded in these competitions.

Distance
Men

Women

Sprint
Men

Women

Freestyle skiing 

Finland has awarded a total quota of 9 athletes (all in men's events) by the International Ski Federation (FIS), based on competitions in the International FIS Calendar during the qualification period of July 2012–19 January 2014. National quotas per each Olympic event were allocated according to points awarded in these competitions. On January 31, 2014, a fourth slopestyle spot was allocated to the team after a scheduling and calculation adjustment.

Halfpipe

Moguls

Ski cross

Qualification legend: FA – Qualify to medal round; FB – Qualify to consolation round

Slopestyle

Ice hockey 

Finland is defending the men's and women's bronze medals won in the previous games.

Men's tournament 

Governing body of the Olympic ice hockey is the International Ice Hockey Federation (IIHF). Top 9 teams in the men's IIHF World Ranking of 2012 qualified directly to the games, Finland ranking 2nd.

Roster
The following players are in the reserve, in case of injuries before the games begin:
 Goalkeepers: Antti Raanta, Pekka Rinne
 Defenders: Topi Jaakola, Petteri Nummelin, Jere Karalahti, Rasmus Ristolainen, Tuukka Mäntylä
 Forwards: Sean Bergenheim, Teemu Hartikainen, Jarkko Immonen

Saku Koivu refused a spot in the team due to a concussion suffered in November 2013.

Group standings
Finland will play in Group B. All times are local (UTC+4).

Quarterfinal

Semifinal

Bronze medal game

Teemu Selänne, at age 43 years and 234 days, became the oldest ice hockey player to win an Olympic medal. He also holds the Olympic record for total ice hockey points, upping it to 43. He also shares the record for most appearances in ice hockey at the Olympics, appearing in 6.

Women's tournament 

Top 6 teams in the women's IIHF World Ranking of 2012 qualified directly to the games, Finland ranking 3rd.

Roster

Group standings
Finland will play in Group A. All times are local (UTC+4).

Quarterfinal

5th-8th place semifinal

5th place game

Nordic combined 

Finland has awarded a total quota of 4 athletes and a spot in the team relay, based on points achieved in the FIS Nordic Combined World Cup and secondarily in the FIS Nordic Combined Continental Cup during the qualification period of July 2012–19 January 2014.

Ski jumping 

Finland has qualified a total quota of six athletes (five men and one woman) by the International Ski Federation (FIS), based on their performances at the FIS Ski Jumping World Cup and secondarily on the Continental Cup results during the qualification period of July 2012–19 January 2014.

Men

Women

Snowboarding 

Finland has awarded a total quota of 13 spots (10 in men's events and 3 in women's) by the International Ski Federation (FIS) based on competitions in the International FIS Calendar during the period of July 2012–9 January 2014. On 31 January 2014, slopestyle snowboarder Petja Piiroinen was originally selected to the Finnish Olympic team, but was relegated into a reserve after a scheduling adjustment.

Halfpipe

Slopestyle

Qualification Legend: QF – Qualify directly to final; QS – Qualify to semifinal

 Snowboard cross

Speed skating 

Finland has awarded four spots (all in the men's events, while the nation has the first priority for a reserve spot in the women's) based on their performance at the  2013–14 ISU Speed Skating World Cup.

Men

Miscellaneous

Sport psychologist
In order to improve mental training in the team, the Finnish Olympic Committee recruited a sport psychologist, Hannaleena Ronkainen. This was a part of a long-term coaching program launched in 2013 with a target to reach its fullest by 2016. Mental trainer and sprinter Hanna-Maari Latvala expressed scepticism at the haste in which the project was launched, and the capability of a single psychologist to service a team of one hundred representing various sports. The women's ice hockey team have a dedicated psychologist, Sari Honkanen.

Limited accreditations
The staff accreditations in an Olympic team were limited by a quota based on the number of athletes, and the Finnish Olympic Committee could not send as many coaches as they wished. Some personal coaches left out, who without an accreditation would have had to attend as spectators with little personal contact with their athletes, preferred to remain in Finland and rely on telephone communications. A vocal critic was Ari Saukko, the personal coach of Janne Ahonen, who was denied accreditation by the Committee, and after public complaints was offered an unsatisfactory alternative trip arrangement, which he would have had to pay for in his own expense.

Political boycotts by Finns

Minister of Culture and Sport of Finland Paavo Arhinmäki decided not to participate the opening ceremony, citing human rights violations and environmental issues, but planned to visit some of the events, and objected to an athletes' boycott. President Sauli Niinistö and Prime Minister Jyrki Katainen will attend the opening ceremony. The Left Youth had earlier called for a boycott on the games on behalf of Niinistö, Katainen and Arhinmäki. Minister for Foreign Affairs Erkki Tuomioja opposed boycotts and wished the games to be held separate from politics. However, Jari Porttila reported, that only Niinistö had been invited to the opening ceremony, and Arhinmäki had received a reservation merely for the final days of the games.

See also
Finland at the 2014 Winter Paralympics

References

External links 

 
 

Nations at the 2014 Winter Olympics
2014
Winter Olympics